Robert Morrice Duncan Duffus (27 February 1891 – 19 March 1949) was a Scottish footballer who played for Dundee, Dumbarton, Millwall, Clapton Orient and Accrington Stanley.

References

1891 births
1949 deaths
Scottish footballers
Dumbarton F.C. players
Millwall F.C. players
Dundee F.C. players
Accrington Stanley F.C. players
Scottish Football League players
English Football League players
Leyton Orient F.C. players
Footballers from Aberdeen
Association football midfielders